The Manhattan Transfer Live was recorded by The Manhattan Transfer live at Manchester on April 23, 1978; Bristol on April 28, 1978; and the Hammersmith Odeon Theatre, London, on May 2, 1978.  The album was produced by Tim Hauser and Janis Siegel. This was the final album made with Laurel Massé (due to a car accident in early 1979 and her decision to leave the group).

It was not originally issued in the U.S. in 1978 but in 1979 it was released as an was issued as an Audiophile LP. A short-lived Japanese CD was released on October 10, 1987. It was finally officially issued on CD in the U.S. by Wounded Bird Records in 2005.

In the live performances there was a "15 minute Intermission" at the end of side one, between "Speak Up Mambo (Cuentame)" (CD track 8) and "In the Dark" (CD track 9).

Background
The album was not originally issued in the United States in 1978. In the U.S. the album was issued as an Audiophile LP in 1979 by Mobile Fidelity Sound Lab in a collector's edition under the name "Original Master Recording" (discs made from the  original masters). For many years, ending in 2005, The Manhattan Transfer Live was the only album of the group that was not reissued in the U.S. on CD. Warner-Pioneer in Japan released a CD version in 1987.

The cover of the standard editions of Atlantic Records was described by Janis Siegel as  "the worst cover in history (perhaps only after Mecca for Moderns and Coming Out, is a drawing in a cartoon style of the four members of the group, and was reused for the re-release on CD of the Wounded Bird Records of June 21, 2005, while that of the edition Mobile Fidelity Sound Lab is a photograph depicting the silhouette of the group at twilight (photography included in the inner envelope of the Atlantic version).

Track listing
 "That Cat Is High" - (J.M. Williams) - 3:15
 "Snootie Little Cutie" - (Bob Troup) - 3:19
 "Four Brothers" - (Jimmy Giuffre, Jon Hendricks) - 3:56
 "On a Little Street in Singapore" - (Billy Hill, Peter De Rose) - 3:36
 "Java Jive" - (Milton Drake, Ben Oakland) - 2:54
 "Walk In Love" - (David Batteau, John Klemmer) - 3:20
 "Chanson D'Amour" - (Wayne Shanklin) - 2:36
 "Speak Up Mambo (Cuentame)" - (Al Castellanos) - 3:21
 "15 Minute Intermission" - (Sonny Skylar) - 1:36
 "In the Dark" - (Lil Green, Bill Broonzy) - 4:14
 "Je Voulais (Te Dire Que Je T'Attends)" - (Michel Jonasz, Pierre Grosz) - 4:49
 "Sunday" - (Jule Styne, Chester Cohn, Bennie Krueger, Ned Miller) -  - 0:41
 "Candy" - (Mark David, Joan Whitney, Alex Kramer) - 3:35
 "Well, Well, Well" - (Terry Shand, Billy Moll, Dick Robertson) - 1:52
 "Freddy Morris Monologue" - (Alan Paul) - 1:07
 "Bacon Fat" - (Andre Williams) - 3:33
 "Turn Me Loose" - (Doc Pomus, Mort Shuman) - 2:50
 "Operator" - (William Spivery) - 3:52
 "Tuxedo Junction" - (Erskine Hawkins, William Johnson, Buddy Feyne, Julian Dash) - 3:01

Personnel 

The Manhattan Transfer
 Tim Hauser
 Laurel Massé
 Alan Paul
 Janis Siegel

Musicians
 Dave Wallace – keyboards
 Wayne Johnson – guitars
 Michael Schnoebelen – bass guitar, contrabass
 Peter Johnson – drums
 Don Roberts – flute
 Keith Bird, Derek Grossmith, Eddie Mordue, Don Roberts and Stan Sultzman – saxophone
 Cliff Hardie and David Horler – trombone
 Geof Perkins – bass trombone
 Tony Fisher, Bobby Haughey, Ronnie Hughes and Derek Watkins – trumpet
 David Katz – music contractor

Production 
 Producer – Tim Hauser
 Associate Producer – Janis Siegel
 Recording and Remix – Keith Grant
 Recorded on The Rolling Stones Mobile Unit
 Remixed at Olympic Studios (London, England).
 Management – Brian Avnet and Shep Gordon at Alive Enterprises.
 Management Assistant – Joanna Fitzpatrick
 Road Manager – David H. Banks
 Stage Manager – John Cutcliffe 
 Monitor Mixer – Shawn Michael
 Lighting Director – Sid Strong
 Wardrobe – Margo Banks

References

External links

The Manhattan Transfer albums
1978 live albums